Teatro may refer to:
 Theatre
 Teatro (band), musical act signed to Sony BMG
 Teatro (Willie Nelson album), 1998
 Teatro (Draco Rosa album), 2008